Oarisma is a genus of butterflies in the skipper family, Hesperiidae.

Species
Listed alphabetically:
Oarisma boeta (Hewitson, 1870)
Oarisma bruneri Bell, 1959 – Bruner's skipperling
Oarisma edwardsii (Barnes, 1897) – Edwards' skipperling 
Oarisma era Dyar, 1927 – bold-veined skipperling
Oarisma garita (Reakirt, 1866) – Garita skipperling, western skipperling, and Garita skipper 
Oarisma nanus (Herrich-Schäffer, 1865) – nanus skipperling
Oarisma poweshiek (Parker, 1870) – Poweshiek skipperling

References

External links
Natural History Museum Lepidoptera genus database

Hesperiinae
Hesperiidae genera
Taxa named by Samuel Hubbard Scudder